Manuel Romeo (September 21, 1891 – October 3, 1954 in  Buenos Aires) was an Argentine film director, screenwriter, dramatist and score composer, and one of the influential directors in the cinema of Argentina of the classic era. He directed and wrote over 50 films between 1931 and 1951 even composing the musical scores for several.

He was a pioneer of Variety Theatre, and one of the few tango lyrical writers that has reached timeless classical success. When he was a teenager, he began his journalist job in the Magacine  Fray Mochoy, and in the newspapers Crítica y Última Hora.

His first play, "Teatro breve" is from  1919 with the  collaboration of Ivo Pelay. He wrote 180 more. In 1922 the most famous,  "El bailarín del cabaret", was staged with the César Ratti's company, where Corsini triunfó (had a success) with "Patotero sentimental".

In 1923 he travelled to Europe with  Luis Bayón Herrera. In Paris, where he acted on several plays,  he met Carlos Gardel and the idea of filmmaking was born. He wrote the plot and songs for "Luces de Buenos Aires", directed by Adelqui Millar. It starred Gloria Guzmán, Sofía Bozán, Pedro Quartucci and the Julio De Caro musical group.

He returned to Buenos Aires, where he introduced the new ideas taken from music hall and varieties shows.  He started to work at the Lumitón cinema company, with Enrique Telémaco Susini . With that film company, released in February 1935, "Noches de Buenos Aires", written and directed by Romero, his cinema career began. The film starred Tita Merello, Irma Córdoba, Enrique Serrano and Fernando Ochoa.

He filmed very quickly, he only wanted to have it finished as soon as possible and achieve a good box office outcome. His films were rejected by critics and intellectuals as a result, but ordinary people liked his style because they knew him from radio of variety shows.

He directed films such as Adiós pampa mía in 1946.

Filmography

 1931 The Pure Truth
 1932 When Do You Commit Suicide?
 1935 Buenos Aires Nights
 1935 The Favorite
 1936 Don Quijote del altillo
 1936 La muchachada de a bordo
 1936 Radio Bar
 1937 El cañonero de Giles
 1937 La muchacha del circo
 1937 La vuelta de Rocha
 1937 Outside the Law
 1937 The Boys Didn't Wear Hair Gel Before 
 1938 La rubia del camino
 1938 Three Argentines in Paris 
 1938 Women Who Work
 1939 Gente bien (Affluent People)
 1939 Muchachas que estudian (College Girls)
 1939 Divorce in Montevideo
 1939 La vida es un tango
 1939 The Model and the Star
 1940 Carnaval de antaño
 1940 Isabelita
 1940 Los muchachos se divierten
 1940 Honeymoon in Rio
 1940 Marriage in Buenos Aires
 1941 El tesoro de la isla Maciel
 1941 I Want to Be a Chorus Girl
 1941 Un bebé de París
 1941 You Are My Love
 1942 A Light in the Window
 1942 Elvira Fernández, vendedora de tiendas
 1942 Historia de crímenes (Tale of Crimes)
 1942 Ven mi corazón te llama (When My Heart Calls)
 1943 El fabricante de estrellas
 1943 La calle Corrientes
 1944 Hay que casar a Paulina
 1946 Adiós pampa mía
 1946 El diablo andaba en los choclos
 1947 Christmas with the Poor 
 1948 El rey del cabaret
 1948 La rubia Mireya
 1948 Porteña de corazón
 1948 The Tango Returns to Paris 
 1949 Morir en su ley
 1949 Mujeres que bailan
 1949 La historia del tango (The Story of the Tango)
 1949 Un tropezón cualquiera da en la vida
 1950 Juan Mondiola
 1950 Valentina 
 1951 Arriba el telón o el patio de la morocha
 1951 Derecho viejo
 1951 The Fan
 1953 Ue... paisano!

External links

 
 

1891 births
1954 deaths
Argentine film directors
Male screenwriters
Argentine film score composers
Male film score composers
People from Buenos Aires
Tango film directors
20th-century composers
20th-century male musicians
20th-century Argentine screenwriters
20th-century Argentine male writers